"The Old Man No One Loves" is a song written by Wyman Asbill and recorded by George Jones for his 1988 LP Too Wild Too Long on Epic Records.  It was released as the third single from the album but failed to make the Top 50, peaking at #63.  The song pulls on the same heartstrings as Jones' biggest hit, "He Stopped Loving Her Today," complete with Billy Sherrill's sweeping production and a recitation recounting the protagonist's funeral.  Jones also made his second music video for the song, the first having been "Who's Gonna Fill Their Shoes."  "The Old Man No One Loves" was Jones' fourth consecutive single that failed to make the Top 25 on the Billboard country singles chart, which was beginning to be dominated by a new generation of country singers.

Chart performance

References

1988 songs
Song recordings produced by Billy Sherrill
Epic Records singles
George Jones songs